Mlodzinava (formerly) is a village in Kėdainiai district municipality, in Kaunas County, in central Lithuania. According to the 2011 census, the village was uninhabited. It is located by the Dotnuvėlė river.

History
At the end of the 19th century it was a folwark of the Grużewski estate.

Demography

References

Villages in Kaunas County
Kėdainiai District Municipality